is a former Japanese footballer.

Club statistics
Updated to 23 February 2018.

References

External links
Profile at Tokushima Vortis

1994 births
Living people
Kwansei Gakuin University alumni
Association football people from Osaka Prefecture
Japanese footballers
J2 League players
Tokushima Vortis players
Association football defenders